Pelonomus obscurus is a species of long-toed water beetle in the family Dryopidae. It is found in the Caribbean Sea, Central America, and North America.

Subspecies
These two subspecies belong to the species Pelonomus obscurus:
 Pelonomus obscurus gracilipes Chevrolat, 1864
 Pelonomus obscurus obscurus LeConte, 1852

References

Further reading

 

Dryopidae
Articles created by Qbugbot
Beetles described in 1852